Musical Massage is an album by Leon Ware released in 1976. This was his second solo album and his only release for Motown's Gordy Records subsidy.

Background
By 1975, Ware was signed to Motown as a solo artist. He started working on demos for his next album as well as to win a record deal for T-Boy Ross. One of the demo recordings, "I Want You", was heard by Berry Gordy, who decided the song would be a good fit for Marvin Gaye. Gaye heard the other demos Ware had worked on and decided to record much of it for what would be his next album, I Want You. Buoyed by the number-one title track, that album peaked at number-one on the Soul charts and reached the top ten of the Billboard 200 and sold over a million copies.

Having given away the material for his album, Ware had no choice but to compose an entirely new set of songs. The result would be Ware's second album, Musical Massage. Produced primarily by Ware with Hal Davis producing three tracks (Instant Love, Body Heat & Share Your Love). Musical Massage picks up right where Gaye's "I Want You" leaves off utilizing some of the same musicians.

Legacy and influence 
Following the release of I Want You, Ware released Musical Massage in September 1976. The album failed to chart and was not properly promoted by Motown. Despite this, Musical Massage has become a cult hit among soul music fans who were intrigued by I Want You and songs from that album's producer. Critical recognition of Ware's album later improved, being cited by AllMusic as "the perfect mix of soul, light funk, jazz, and what was about to become the rhythmic foundation for disco." "Musical Massage" was released on CD for the first time by UK label Expansion Records in 2001 and then by Motown in 2003 in the US.

Track listing

Bonus tracks: The 'I Want You' Sessions

Personnel

 Leon Ware – lead and background vocals
 Jerry Peters, John Barnes, Sonny Burke – keyboard
 Chuck Rainey – bass
 David T. Walker, Ray Parker Jr. – guitar
 James Gadson – drums
 Bobbye Hall, Gary Coleman – percussion
 Eddie "Bongo" Brown – bongo
 Felicia Griner, Jessie Smith, Merry Clayton, Minnie Riperton, Marvin Gaye, Bobby Womack – background vocals
 Azizi Johari – cover artwork model

References

External links
 

1976 albums
Leon Ware albums
Albums produced by Leon Ware
Gordy Records albums